Peterlee Town F.C. is a football club from Peterlee, England who currently play in the Wearside Football League.

History
The club was formed in 1976 as Peterlee Newtown and three years after forming they joined the Wearside League and played in that league until 1982 when they finished runners-up, joining the newly expanded Northern League in Division Two winning the Second Division Championship at the first attempt and were promoted to Division One. In the next few years, they had a yo-yo existence between the two divisions, gaining a further three promotions to  Division One. In 1985–86 they reached the 4th Qualifying Round of the FA Cup, losing in the replay to Whitby Town. After their relegation from the top division in 2004–05, the team finished at the bottom of Division Two in 2005–06 and were relegated to the Northern Alliance.

In 2006 the club changed its name to Peterlee Town F.C.

In September 2008 Peterlee beat Billingham Town 2–0 in the Second Round Qualifying of the FA Vase at the Eden Lane Ground. This win saw them play Newcastle Benfield in the First Round Proper of the competition where they lost 4–1.

In 2011 they club rejoined the Wearside League with the club stating on their website that this has "helped attract more local talent and will almost certainly help Peterlee move back into the Northern League within the next few years."

Honours
Northern Football League Division Two
Champions 1982–83
Runners-up 1993–94

Records
FA Cup
Fourth Qualifying Round 1985–86
FA Trophy
Second Qualifying Round 1984–85, 1992–93
FA Vase
Third Round 1981–82, 1982–83, 1989–90

References

External links
Official website

Defunct football clubs in England
Association football clubs established in 1976
Football clubs in County Durham
1976 establishments in England
Wearside Football League
Northern Football League
Northern Football Alliance
Peterlee